Wilhelmshorst station is a railway station in the Wilhelmshorst district of the municipality Michendorf located in the district of Potsdam-Mittelmark, Brandenburg, Germany.

References

Railway stations in Brandenburg
Buildings and structures in Potsdam-Mittelmark